Nellaidhoo is one of the inhabited islands of Haa Dhaalu Atoll administrative division and geographically part of Thiladhummathi Atoll in the north of the Maldives.

Geography

Environment

On 8 December 1821, an extremely strong cyclone hit Nellaidhoo and many other islands in northern Maldives, causing severe damage. In 2006 the government of Maldives listed Nellaidhoo as one of the islands under significant threat from sea level rise due to global warming. The government planned to relocate the population to larger islands with more facilities and better protection against rising sea levels. On 6 September 2006, the residents of the island protested outside the island office as their opinion was not consulted before considering the relocation.

Demography

Economy
Nellaidhoo is historically famous for fishing. However, fishing has decreased in importance. The younger generation, especially, engage more with tourism. Many people are involved in the construction industry. Women play a key role on the island, looking after children and doing work such as thatch weaving and coir rope making. Nowadays making snacks and selling is also common work for the women.

Sport
Football and Bashi are the common sports in the island and rarely netball and volleyball too. Nellaidhoo has won the H.Dh. Atoll Inter School Football Tournament named as "Kulhudhuffushi Bodukaleyfanu cup" in 1993 and FAM H.Dh Atoll Tournament in 2001 and 2002.

References

External links
Secretariat of Nellaidhoo Council

Islands of the Maldives